In Jewish ritual law, a zav (lit. "one who[se body] flows") is a man who has had abnormal seminal discharge from the male sexual organ, and thus entered a state of ritual impurity. A woman who has had similar abnormal discharge from her genitals is known as a zavah.

Purification requirements for the zav include counting seven days without seminal discharge, immersion in a spring, and bringing certain korbanot (sacrifices). In the realm of tumah and taharah law, the zav has the ability to create a midras and is prohibited from entering specific areas of the Temple Mount.

Etymology 
The Hebrew verb stem zuv (Hebrew זוּב), in binyan Qal form, is zava (זָבָה). It means "to flow,"  as in "a land flowing with (זָבַת) milk and honey".

Hebrew Bible

Verses 
The laws governing zav status appear in the book of Leviticus, introduced as follows:

This is followed by the laws relating to a zav: the impurity laws, the purification procedure when the flow has stopped, and the sacrifices to be offered after purification.

The similar laws of a zavah appear later in the same chapter. The commandment regarding niddah, found in the same chapter, uses the same Hebrew verb meaning "to flow", even though its laws are somewhat different from that of the zav or zavah.

In the second year after the Exodus from Egypt, when the Israelites were about to travel, they were commanded to send the zav outside the camp.

Modern analysis 
Some modern Biblical scholars see these regulations as having originally derived from taboos against contact with semen, because it is considered to house life itself, and was consequently considered sacred; the seven-day period is thought to exist to ensure that the abnormality has genuinely ceased, the sin offering is considered to have originally been made as an apology for violating the taboo.

In rabbinical literature

Discussion of the physical situation 
The male zav'''s discharge is different from that of the female zavah: the zavah emits blood, while the zav emits a whitish fluid, which has a slight reddish tinge. According to Maimonides, the zav state as a disease of the male reproductive system while the man's general health remains normal, causing semen to ooze out without stimulation, erection, or pleasure; and to be discolored and have a thin consistency.

Based on the  biblical Hebrew word החתים (lit. “sealed”) Abraham ibn Ezra mentions that zav status can also mean complete loss of ejaculation ability. Maimonides understands the same word as meaning even a minute amount of ‘Zav’ discharge that passes the exiting boundary of the male urinary tract.

 Laws 

If a man observes the abnormal discharge once, he becomes impure for a single day, like one who ejaculated normal semen. If he observes the discharge twice, the full seven-day period of impurity is required. If he observes it three times, he is also required to bring the specified sacrifice. These observations can occur on the same day, or on consecutive days. Only after the week's wait and immersion would he become ritually pure once more, but he would not be permitted to eat terumah until nightfall nor to eat the flesh of a sacrifice until after bringing his sacrifice.

The zav is quantified as an Av HaTumah, something able to transfer uncleanliness. In addition, his actual zav discharge, saliva, semen, and urine are also deemed to have Av HaTumah status.

In regard to the transportability of tumah from the zav, the Mishnah records that if a ritually clean person and a zav both sat on an animal, or in a small boat, then the ritually clean person would become ritually unclean by doing so, regardless of how far apart they might sit. This is known as hesset ("minor movement").

Regular ejaculation is treated as being distinct from zav, and is  known as keri.

 Viewed as Divine punishment 
Ibn Ezra notes that the Torah requirement of bringing a sin-offering upon the completion of seven clean days is an indication that the zav committed a sinful act that incurred his zav status. Similarly, Hezekiah ben Manoah writes that the textual order of the zav laws near those of tzaraath and embezzlement (me'ilah), and demonstrate that zav status is incurred by lack of earnestness (to God) and sin.

Rabbi Shabbatai HaKohen ("the Shach") comments that zav status is a divine consequence for excessive indulgence in physical relations that take place in the laying position.  Thus, as consequence, items the zav will lay upon (i.e. midras objects) will become tamei (impure) for the duration of his zav state.

 In modern Judaism 
The laws of zav have little relevance nowadays, as a state of purity is only required for activities such as entering the Temple and eating terumah - activities which are not practiced nowadays.

A zav'' would be prohibited from visiting the Temple Mount nowadays without undergoing the purification procedure.

See also 
 Zavah

Further reading 
 Sefer Hachinuch, Mitzvah 178
 Mishnah, Seder Tohoroth, tractate Zavim

References 

Jewish ritual purity law
Hebrew words and phrases in the Hebrew Bible
Hebrew words and phrases in Jewish law